The Murderkill River is a river flowing to Delaware Bay in central Delaware in the United States.

The Murderkill flows for its entire length in southern Kent County.  It rises just west of Felton and flows generally east-northeastwardly, through Killen Pond (site of Killens Pond State Park) and Coursey Pond, under Carpenters Bridge, and past Frederica to Bowers, where it enters Delaware Bay about 0.5 miles (1 km) south of the mouth of the St. Jones River.    The Murderkill River is tidally influenced from its mouth upstream to just past Frederica, and is considered by the U.S. Army Corps of Engineers to be navigable for the lower 10 miles (16 km) of its course.

According to 2002 data from the United States Environmental Protection Agency, 55% of the area of the Murderkill River's watershed is occupied by agricultural uses; 17% is forested; 14% is urban; 9% is wetland; and 2% is water.

Origin of name 
One description of the river's naming was recorded in 1945 by George R. Stewart, but is now considered to be a folk tale:

Dick Carter, Chair of the Delaware Heritage Commission, states that the name of Murderkill River is taken from the original Dutch for Mother River. Mother is moeder in Middle Dutch, and river is Kille. Later, under British rule, the word "River" was added to the waterway's name, effectively making it "mother river river." The term "kill" is used in areas of Dutch influence in the Netherlands' former North American colony of New Netherland, primarily the Hudson and Delaware Valleys to describe a creek, river, tidal inlet, strait, or arm of the, sea such as Bronx Kill in New York and Schuylkill River in Pennsylvania.

Delaware's creeks and rivers are slow-moving and there is deep mud associated with marshy rivers. Dutch "modder" = mud, a false cognate to "mother." Modder Kill = Muddy Creek or Muddy River. The word is still used in Dutch, such as this Dutch video of a tractor stuck in mud ("vast in de modder").

Also, in New York there is Muddy Kill, with a clear connection to the older Dutch name.

Variant names 
According to the Geographic Names Information System, the Murderkill River has also been known historically as:
Mordare Kijhlen
Mother Creek
Mother Kill
Motherkill
Motherkiln Creek
Mothers Creek
Murder Kill Creek
Murther Creek
Murtherkill

See also 
List of Delaware rivers
Kill (body of water)

References 

Rivers of Kent County, Delaware
Rivers of Delaware
Tributaries of Delaware Bay